Bécancour—Nicolet—Saurel (formerly Bas-Richelieu—Nicolet—Bécancour and Richelieu) is a federal electoral district in Quebec, Canada, that has been represented in the House of Commons of Canada since 1968.

Geography
The riding, along the south shore of the Saint Lawrence River opposite the city of Trois-Rivières, straddles the Quebec regions of Centre-du-Québec and Montérégie.

The riding consists of:
 the Regional County Municipality of Pierre-De Saurel (formerly Le Bas-Richelieu)
 the Regional County Municipality of Nicolet-Yamaska, including Odanak Indian reserve No. 12; and
 the Regional County Municipality of Bécancour, including Wôlinak Indian reserve No. 11.

The neighbouring ridings are Lotbinière—Chutes-de-la-Chaudière, Mégantic—L'Érable, Richmond—Arthabaska, Drummond, Saint-Hyacinthe—Bagot, Pierre-Boucher—Les Patriotes—Verchères, Berthier—Maskinongé, Trois-Rivières, Saint-Maurice—Champlain, and Portneuf—Jacques-Cartier.

History
It was created as "Richelieu" riding in 1968 from parts of Nicolet—Yamaska and Richelieu—Verchères ridings.

It was renamed "Bas-Richelieu—Nicolet—Bécancour" in 1998.

In 2003, Bas-Richelieu—Nicolet—Bécancour was abolished when it was redistributed into a new "Richelieu" riding, which incorporated parts of Lotbinière—L'Érable riding. Richelieu was renamed "Bas-Richelieu—Nicolet—Bécancour" after the 2004 election.

The 2012 federal electoral redistribution has concluded that this riding will have the same boundaries for the 42nd Canadian federal election, but will be renamed Bécancour—Nicolet—Saurel.

Members of Parliament
This riding has elected the following Members of Parliament:

Election results

Bécancour—Nicolet—Saurel, 2013 Representation Order

Bécancour—Nicolet—Saurel retained the same boundaries as its predecessor, Bas-Richelieu—Nicolet—Bécancour, for the 42nd Canadian federal election:

Bas-Richelieu—Nicolet—Bécancour, 2003 Representation Order

Richelieu, 2003 Representation Order

Bas-Richelieu—Nicolet—Bécancour, 1996 Representation Order

Richelieu, 1996 Representation Order

Richelieu, 1968–1996

See also
 List of Canadian federal electoral districts
 Past Canadian electoral districts

References

Campaign expense data from Elections Canada
Riding history from the Library of Parliament:
Richelieu 1966-1998
Bas-Richelieu—Nicolet—Bécancour 1998-2003
Richelieu 2003- 2004
Bas-Richelieu—Nicolet—Bécancour 2004-present

Notes

External links
 Atlas of Canada

Quebec federal electoral districts
Nicolet, Quebec
Sorel-Tracy